Richard Emil Bjork (1930–1984) was Vice-Chancellor of the New Jersey Board of Higher Education.  He served as the Interim President of Glassboro State College and later he was instrumental in the site selection, naming, and development of Richard Stockton State College where he served as the college's first president.

References

1930 births
1984 deaths
Date of birth missing
Place of birth missing
Date of death missing
Place of death missing
Heads of universities and colleges in the United States
Stockton University faculty
Rowan University faculty
20th-century American academics